Malcolm W. Martin Memorial Park is a park on the east side of the Mississippi River in East St. Louis, Illinois, directly across from the Gateway Arch and the city of St. Louis, Missouri. The Gateway Geyser is a counterpart to the equally tall Gateway Arch, and is visible from the west side of the river to the right of the prominent Cargill grain elevator. Four smaller fountains around the Geyser represent the four rivers which converge near the two cities: The Mississippi, Missouri, Illinois, and Meramec. The park also includes an elevated viewing point overlooking the river.

History

Vision
Arch designer Eero Saarinen conceptualized a memorial touching both banks of the Mississippi River, but funding was not provided for the east side as the extensive Gateway Arch National Park (then known as the Jefferson National Expansion Memorial) took shape in St. Louis, of which the Arch is the most prominent element. One of the many supporters of the 1947 effort to fund that landmark was St. Louis attorney Malcolm W. Martin. After two decades without development on the Illinois side, Martin founded the Gateway Center of Metropolitan St. Louis to fund land acquisition for a park there, in 1968. He headed a federal committee in 1987 planning its design, and won an award for his work the following year.

Martin came home to St. Louis after graduating from Yale in 1933 to get his law degree from St. Louis City College of Law. He left for Europe in World War II and contributed to the Normandy D-Day invasion. Upon his second return to St. Louis, he became involved in many aspects of the community, including as a member of the St. Louis Board of Education and a founder of the area's PBS affiliate.

Realization
Work began with the installation of a 100-foot (30 m) flagpole, shortly after Gateway Center purchased the site from Illinois Central Railroad. The fountain first gushed on May 27, 1995, with Martin at the switch, and when he died in 2004, he left $5 million for the addition of the Mississippi River Overlook and completion of the park. On June 17, 2005, ownership of the site was transferred to the Metro East Park and Recreation District, and the park officially opened in June 2009. Gateway Center continues to pay for the park, but MEPRD owns and maintains it.

Features
Gateway Geyser
Mississippi River Overlook
Malcolm W. Martin Statue
Web camera
Green space and concrete paths
Benches throughout the park
Free parking lot on site
24-hour security station

The overlook platform provides scenic views of the St. Louis Arch and city skyline, the river, and the fountain. It officially opened June 6, 2009.

The geyser has one scheduled eruption every day from May 1 to September 30.  Each eruption lasts 10-minutes and is dependent on wind, weather, and drought conditions. The Gateway Geyser hibernates October through April.

Design
The Gateway Geyser was designed and constructed by St. Louis–based Hydro Dramatics. The fountain has an axial thrust of 103,000 pounds-force (460 kN); water is jetted out of the -tall aerated nozzle at a pressure of 550 pounds per square inch (3.8 MPa). The four smaller fountains use 125-horsepower pumps, and each is fed by water from an 8-acre (3.2 ha), million-gallon (3.8m l) lake in which they sit. The Geyser has an electronic system that shuts it down when winds exceed 13 miles per hour (20.9 km/hr).

It is made of concrete and steel, with lighted railings on all sides. A bronze statue of Martin is sitting at the top, facing the view of the Arch that he helped preserve. A live web camera provides constant access to the scene. The statue was designed by St. Louis sculptor Harry Weber.

Gallery

References

External links 
Malcolm W. Martin Memorial Park – official website
 Hydro Dramatics – fountain page
LewisandClarkTrail.com – video clip about the Geyser
Life in Saudi Arabia (blog) – list of some of the world's tallest fountains
Chosun.com – the current tallest, in Seoul, South Korea

Parks in Illinois
East St. Louis, Illinois
Buildings and structures in St. Clair County, Illinois
Fountains in Illinois
Tourist attractions in St. Clair County, Illinois